Darzin or Darzein may refer to:
 Darzin, Anbarabad
 Darzin 1, Bam County
 Darzin 2, Bam County